Yannick Keith Lizé (born May 16, 1974) is a former water polo player of Canada's national water polo team. He is currently Director of Engineering at Applied Micro Circuits Corporation.  In 2008 he received his Ph.D. in engineering physics at École Polytechnique de Montréal. He competed at the World Championships in Perth, Australia in 1998 and the Olympic qualification tournaments of 1996 and 2000. He was part of the bronze medal-winning men's water polo team at the 1999 Pan American Games in Winnipeg, Manitoba. He is the brother of Olympic athlete Sandra Lizé, a member of the Canada women's national water polo team, that claimed the silver medal at the 2007 Pan American Games in Rio de Janeiro, Brazil.

Personal 
Married Amanda Lizé (née Bearman) on October 10, 2010 in Montreal, Quebec.

External links
 On receiving the Milton Chang grant
IEEE Fellowship Winner
Stanford Lecture

1974 births
Living people
Canadian male water polo players
French Quebecers
Medalists at the 1999 Pan American Games
Pan American Games bronze medalists for Canada
Pan American Games medalists in water polo
Université de Montréal alumni
Water polo players at the 1999 Pan American Games
Water polo players from Quebec City